Caraphia is a genus of longhorned beetles in the family Cerambycidae, found in Central America.

The species Caraphia seriata and Caraphia squamosa formerly made up the genus Noctileptura, which was determined to be a taxonomic synonym of the genus Caraphia.

Species
These species are members of the genus Caraphia:

 Caraphia lingafelteri Ohbayashi & Yamasako, 2016 - Honduras, El Salvador, Nicaragua (Matagalpa)
 Caraphia seriata (Chemsak & Linsley, 1984) - Southern Mexico, Guatemala
 Caraphia squamosa (Chemsak & Linsley, 1984) - Southern Mexico
Caraphia warneri Wappes & Santos-Silva, 2018 - Guatemala
Caraphia woodruffi Wappes & Santos-Silva, 2018 - Guatemala, Honduras

References

Lepturinae